Troy Selwood (born 1 May 1984) is a former Australian rules footballer who played 75 games for the Brisbane Lions in the Australian Football League (AFL). He was also captain of the Geelong Football Club's team in the Victorian Football League (VFL) from 2011 to 2013.

Personal life
A member of the Selwood family, Selwood has three brothers twin brother Adam (who played for ) younger brothers Joel and Scott (who both played for ).

Advocacy
In June 2007, Selwood, alongside his brothers and parents Maree and Bryce, were named AFL celebrity ambassadors for Seeing Eye Dogs Australia.

AFL career
He was recruited as the number 19 draft pick in the 2002 AFL Draft from Sandhurst. He made his debut for the Brisbane Lions wearing the number 28 gernsey in Round 1, 2005 against St Kilda.

Selwood's endurance and accountable style of play saw him mainly utilized in a tagging role on key opposition players.

On 9 May 2009, Selwood was knocked unconscious in a collision with Richmond's Alex Rance.

After Round 21 of the 2010 season, Selwood was told he would be delisted by the Brisbane Lions at the end of the season.

VFL career
On 1 October 2010, Selwood was rumoured to be moving back to his home state of Victoria and to the Geelong Football Club in the hope of resurrecting his AFL career. It is suggested that Selwood will juggle completing his commerce degree, while also working for Geelong and playing for the Cats in the VFL, much as James Podsiadly had previously. He hoped to play AFL in season 2012. He was appointed co-captain of Geelong VFL side at the beginning of the 2011 season.

On 23 September 2012, Selwood led the Geelong Cats VFL side to a premiership defeating Port Melbourne by 33 points at Etihad Stadium in Melbourne. Selwood retired from VFL football at the end of the 2013 season.

References

External links

 Troy Selwood's profile on the official AFL website of the Brisbane Lions Football Club
 
 

1984 births
Living people
Brisbane Lions players
Bendigo Pioneers players
Sandhurst Football Club players
Australian twins
Twin sportspeople
Identical twins
Australian rules footballers from Bendigo